The MTV Movie Award for Best Hero was introduced in 2006, but retired the next year, and reinstated in 2012. A similar category titled Biggest Badass Star was introduced in 2010, nominating only the actor, and not the movie. Daniel Radcliffe is the first recipient to win both this and Best Villain. Ewan McGregor and Dwayne Johnson have received nominations in both categories, but never won in either.

Winners and nominees

Best Hero

Biggest Badass Star

References

MTV Movie & TV Awards